Neglinnaya, in Moscow, Russia, refers to:
 Neglinnaya River, currently locked into a tunnel
 Neglinnaya Street, built in 1820s over this tunnel; the boundary between Tverskoy District and Meshchansky District
 toponym for Central Bank of Russia, headquartered on Neglinnaya Street